The 1968 South American Open was a combined men's and women's tennis tournament played on outdoor clay courts at the Buenos Aires Lawn Tennis Club in Buenos Aires in Argentina. It was the first open edition of the tournament and was held from 4 November through 11 November 1968. Roy Emerson and Ann Jones won the singles titles.

Finals

Men's singles

 Roy Emerson defeated  Rod Laver 9–7, 6–4, 6–4
 It was Emerson's 2nd professional title of the year and the 2nd of his professional career.

Women's singles
 Ann Jones defeated  Nancy Richey walkover

Men's doubles
 Andrés Gimeno /  Fred Stolle defeated  Rod Laver /  Roy Emerson 6–3, 4–6, 7–5, 6–1

Women's doubles
 Rosie Casals /  Ann Jones defeated  Julie Heldman /  Mabel Vrancovich 6–1, 6–2

Mixed doubles
 Julie Heldman /  Herb Fitzgibbon defeated  Edison Mandarino /  Norma Baylon 6–3, 6–4

References

External links
 ATP Tournament Profile

 
South American Open
Davis
1968 in Argentine tennis
ATP Buenos Aires